Novyye Chebenki (Yañı Sebenle) is a rural locality (a selo) in Novochebenkinsky Selsoviet, Zianchurinsky District, Bashkortostan, Russia. The population was 593 as of 2010. There are 6 streets.

Geography 
Novyye Chebenki is located 25 km west of Isyangulovo (the district's administrative centre) by road. Ishemgul is the nearest rural locality.

References 

Rural localities in Zianchurinsky District